Cape Velikan (Russian: Мыс Великан) is a cape on the Sea of Okhotsk coast of the  in southeast Sakhalin, Korsakovsky District, Sakhalin Oblast, Russia.

The west border is formed by the logging road, the east by the offshore rocks that are exposed at low tide. The area includes a complex of coastal ecosystems, comprising the flora of the rocks and supralittoral zone —  (Juniperus chinensis subsp. sargentii), Japanese spikenard (Aralia cordata), and the local spruce-fir forest — a seal rookery, and a bird colony and nesting site.

Within the area, hunting, fishing, specimen collection, and tree felling (other than thinning for maintenance purposes in areas of forest plantation) are prohibited, as is visiting the bird colony between 1 May and 1 August.

See also

 Protected areas of Russia
 La Pérouse Strait

References

Headlands of Sakhalin Oblast
Protected areas of the Russian Far East
Natural monuments of Russia
Protected areas established in 1990
1990 establishments in Russia